Thadavara is a 1981 Indian Malayalam film,  directed by P. Chandrakumar and produced by Augustine Prakash. The film stars Jayan, K. P. Ummer, M. N. Nambiar and Seema in the lead roles. The film has musical score by A. T. Ummer.

Cast
Jayan as Rajan
K. P. Ummer as SP Chandrasekhar
M. N. Nambiar as Madhavan
Seema as Rema
Kanakadurga as Devaki
Nanditha Bose as Nandini
Mala Aravindan as Karnan
Kunchan as Vaasu
Sankaradi as Prof. Vijayanath
Sukumari as Sarojini
Jose Prakash as first leader of the bandit gang
Ceylon Manohar as Vishwam
Jyothi Lakshmi as dancer
Jayamalini as dancer

Release
The film was released on 23 January 1981.

Box office
The film was commercial success.

Soundtrack
The music was composed by A. T. Ummer and the lyrics were written by Sathyan Anthikkad.

References

External links
 

1981 films
1980s Malayalam-language films
Films directed by P. Chandrakumar